Viktor Sirkiä (born 20 March 1949) is a Finnish weightlifter. He competed in the men's heavyweight II event at the 1980 Summer Olympics.

References

1949 births
Living people
Finnish male weightlifters
Olympic weightlifters of Finland
Weightlifters at the 1980 Summer Olympics
Sportspeople from Omsk